Two Harbors, colloquially known as "The Isthmus", is a small unincorporated community island village on the island of Santa Catalina Island, California, with a population of 298 (Census of 2000). It is the second center of population on the island, besides the city of Avalon. It is mainly a resort village. It has only one restaurant, one hotel and one general store. The village has about 150 permanent residents who live on the isthmus year-round. One notable feature was the one-room schoolhouse which closed in 2014.

Geography
On the island's narrow isthmus, it is located about 18 miles from the only city on the island, Avalon. It is named for the two harbors separated by the 770 m section of land separating the leeward (northern) Isthmus Cove (aka Banning Harbor) and Catalina (or Cat) Harbor on the windward (southern) side, which together almost cut off the northwestern sixth (31.7 km) from the main part of the island. White Rock Island, commonly known as Bird Rock, is a small privately owned island only 6312 m² in size.

History
The area where Two Harbors is located was originally referred to simply as the Isthmus of Catalina Island. By the 1860s, mining operations for silver, lead and zinc took place in the area. In 1864, during the Civil War, the Union Army sent 83 soldiers to the island to establish Camp Santa Catalina Island, both to protect the area from Confederate privateers and survey the isthmus and adjacent Catalina Harbor for the Bureau of Indian Affairs as a location for a future Indian reservation for "militant" tribes captured in the Bald Hills War. However, the reservation idea was abandoned and so was the camp.  The barracks that the Army built on the isthmus were later used to house visiting film crews in the 1920s and 1930s, a contingent of the U.S. Coast Guard during World War II, and in 1951 became the home of the Isthmus Yacht Club.

The Ning Po, a Chinese merchant ship built in 1753 and involved in over a century of war, rebellion, and piracy, eventually found its way to Catalina and was converted into a tourist attraction in 1913. The Ning Po burned off the western shore of the isthmus in 1938. The fire which destroyed her also claimed several wooden sailing vessels that had been used in filming motion-picture "spectaculars", including the famous old down-Easter "Llewellyn J. Morse" which stood in for the  — with accurate re-rigging — in the silent film Old Ironsides.

Education

Primary and secondary schools
Two Harbors is part of the Long Beach Unified School District. The one-room school closed in 2014 due to sharply declining enrollment. School age children now attend Avalon Schools K-12.

Colleges and universities
The USC Wrigley Institute for Environmental Studies is an environmental research and education facility run by the University of Southern California in Two Harbors. The campus consists of a 2,800 square-meter (30,000 square-foot) laboratory building, a dormitory housing, a cafeteria, a hyperbaric chamber, and a large waterfront staging area complete with dock, pier, helipad, and diving lockers. The facility was made possible by a donation from the Wrigley family and was named for Philip K. Wrigley.

Transportation
Two Harbors is served by ferry lines with regular daily service to San Pedro. A helicopter can also be chartered to the village. Alternatively, various charter boats offer private service to the island.

Most people generally walk or bike around and between Two Harbors and its neighboring campgrounds, Little Harbor and Parsons Landing. Currently there is no shuttle transportation available for guests between these sites. 

A ferry run by the Catalina Island Company is available seasonally for transportation between Avalon and Two Harbors. Taxi service is also available.

See also

Camp Cherry Valley
Camp Emerald Bay

References

External links

 
 The Catalina Island Conservancy
 The Santa Catalina Island Company
 Two Harbors
 Catalina Express
 Catalina Ferries

Santa Catalina Island (California)
Unincorporated communities in Los Angeles County, California
Campgrounds in California
Populated coastal places in California
Unincorporated communities in California